Goniocorella is a genus of cnidarians belonging to the family Caryophylliidae.

The species of this genus are found in Southern Africa, Southeastern Asia and New Zealand.

Species:

Goniocorella dumosa 
Goniocorella eguchii

References

Caryophylliidae
Scleractinia genera